Junior Stock: Drag Racing the Family Sedan is a 2012 book by author Doug Boyce. The book focuses on NHRA stock-class drag racing that took place between the years 1964 and 1971.

This is the second book by Doug Boyce, the first being the acclaimed, Grumpy's Toys: The Authorized History of Grumpy Jenkins' Cars.

Overview

In the 1950s and 1960s, drag racing was in its infancy, an exciting new sport which anyone with a car could participate. Based upon the car's equipment, they were assigned to specific categories and classes. The stock class format encouraged amateur participation. This structure made it possible to compete against others with similar equipment and lead to the most talented tuners and drivers becoming National Champions and/or World Record holders. Drag racing was a popular hobby for many, and initially their competition vehicles were typically warmed-over street cars that had been strategically upgraded to the limits of their class rules. This made drag racing wildly popular and amazingly attainable. Thanks in part to the book, Junior Stock; Drag Racing The Family Sedan, these times will never be forgotten and can once again be relived. Major stock category rule changes in 1972 meant a loss of participation and great loss in the sport's popularity.

Stock-class drag racing is celebrated in this new book, with approximately 500 vintage b/w and color photographs showing the way it was. Celebrated are all the key players from Phil Chisholm, the first Junior Stock Eliminator winner back in 1964 through 1971 World Champion, Dave Boertman. In between, read briefs on the annual rule changes and coverage of each NHRA National event. Included in each chapter are short biographies on the likes of Dave Kempton, Jere Stahl, Ted Harbit, the Jesel's, John Archambault, Marv Ripes, John Barkley, Bobby Warren, Keith Berg, Tom Schumacher, the Ronca Brothers, Alex Jarrell, the Musser Brothers, Jim Waibel, Callahan & Sulc, John Troxell etc. No stone is left unturned as each region and all brands are recognized in this thoroughly laid out book.

If you were a fan or participant back in the day, or are a lover of vintage drag cars, Junior Stock: Stock Class Drag Racing 1964–1971 is a book you'll thoroughly enjoy.

Slideshow

A promotional video was made for Junior Stock: Drag Racing the Family Sedan two months prior to its release date. The video features a slideshow of rare and unique Junior Stock photographs.

Set to the instrumental song Outa-Space by Billy Preston, the video continues to garner rave reviews and is contributing to the anticipation surrounding the book's August 2012 release.

References

2012 non-fiction books